Eduard Zhevnerov (born 1 November 1987) is a Belarusian professional footballer, who is currently playing for Isloch Minsk Raion.

Career
On 11 August 2010, Zhawneraw played his only match for the national side, coming on as a last-minute substitute in a friendly match against Lithuania.

References

External links

1987 births
Living people
People from Mogilev
Sportspeople from Mogilev Region
Belarusian footballers
Association football defenders
Belarus international footballers
Belarusian expatriate footballers
Expatriate footballers in Lithuania
Belarusian expatriate sportspeople in Lithuania
A Lyga players
FC Savit Mogilev players
FC Spartak Shklov players
FC Dnepr Mogilev players
FC Dinamo Minsk players
FC Belshina Bobruisk players
FC Slavia Mozyr players
FC Vitebsk players
FC Dynamo Brest players
FK Jonava players
FC Smolevichi players
FC Slutsk players
FC Isloch Minsk Raion players